Hambok is a village in western Eritrea. It is located in Gogne District in the Gash-Barka region.

Nearby towns and villages include Kieru (16.7 nm), Ad Casub (10.6 nm), Markaughe (6.5 nm),  Bisha (6.8 nm), Adi Ali Bakit (11.1 nm), Attai (7.4 nm), Abaredda (7.8 nm) and Mescul (6.3 nm).

External links
Satellite map at Maplandia.com

Villages in Eritrea